Lewis Freeman Mott (1863 – November 20, 1941) was an American English scholar, born in New York and educated at the City College (S.B., 1883) and at Columbia (Ph.D., 1896). He taught at City College where he became professor in 1897 and from which he retired in 1934. Mott served as president of the Modern Language Association in 1911.  He wrote The System of Courtly Love (1894), The Provencal Lyric (1901) and Sainte-Beuve (1925).

His wife, Alice Garrigue Mott (1861–1948), was the younger sister of Tomáš Masaryk's wife.

References

External links
 
 

1863 births
1941 deaths
American motivational speakers
Columbia University alumni